King's Highway 413, known as the GTA West Corridor or GTA West until 2021, is a proposed 400-series highway and bus transitway in the western Greater Toronto Area of the Canadian province of Ontario. The approximately  route is currently undergoing planning and analysis under an environmental impact assessment (EA) by both the Ministry of Transportation of Ontario (MTO) and the Government of Ontario, as well as the Impact Assessment Agency of Canada. If approved, a new four-to-six lane controlled-access highway would be built between the existing interchange of Highway 401 and the 407 ETR at the Halton–Peel boundary, and Highway 400 north of Vaughan. In addition, two new extensions would be built to connect Highway 410 and Highway 427 with Highway413.

The proposed highway would serve as an outer ring road around the built-up areas of Brampton and Vaughan that would permit traffic travelling between Southwestern Ontario and Ontario's cottage country or Northern Ontario to bypass much of the Greater Toronto Area. However, the highway has attracted criticism for its environmental impacts, including concerns about its footprint on designated farmland in the Greenbelt, and its implications to encourage urban sprawl and induced demand. 

Planning for the corridor began in the mid 2000s. However the EA was suspended in 2015, and the project shelved in February 2018 by the Liberal government of Kathleen Wynne. Following the 2018 Ontario general election in June of that year, the new Progressive Conservative government of Doug Ford announced the resumption of the suspended EA in November. Since then, several of the municipalities along the route have voiced their opposition to its construction.

Route description 
The proposed route of Highway413 was confirmed in the Technically Preferred Route report, which was published by Aecon and released on August7, 2020.
The approximately  route would consist of a four-to-six lane freeway as well as a transitway situated within a -wide right-of-way.
Fifteen interchanges were proposed. Four of the interchanges, including both termini, would be freeway-to-freeway. The corridor would arch around the west and north sides of the rural–urban fringe of Brampton, skirting the boundary between the regions of Halton and Peel before proceeding northwest into York Region.

The southwestern end would be at a freeway-to-freeway connection at the existing interchange between Highway401 and Highway407ETR at the tripoint of Halton Hills, Milton and Mississauga. It would meander northward, entering Brampton at an interchange with Winston Churchill Boulevard. Crossing the Credit River immediately east of Georgetown, it would gradually curve northwest to parallel Old School Road east of Heritage Road. It would interchange with Regional Road107 (Bovaird Drive), which becomes Highway 7 to the west beyond the Brampton–Halton Hills boundary. Midway between Bovaird Drive and the next interchange at Peel Regional Road14 (Mayfield Road), the freeway would cross the CN Halton Subdivision, which carries the Kitchener line of GO Transit.

Beyond Mayfield Road, Highway413 would make a broad curve to the northeast into Caledon, passing Peel Regional Road1 (Mississauga Road). Travelling roughly parallel to and midway between Mayfield Road and Peel Regional Road9 (King Street), it would pass northwest of Snelgrove after interchanges with Chinguacousy Road and Highway 10.
To the east of Snelgrove, a new extension of Highway410, bypassing  of the extension south of Snelgrove that opened November16, 2009, would meet Highway413 at a freeway-to-freeway interchange.
To the east would be an incomplete interchange with Bramalea Road. After interchanges with Peel Regional Road7 (Airport Road) and Peel Regional Road8 (The Gore Road), the route would curve east to pass between the town of Bolton and the Brampton neighbourhood of Castlemore. An interchange at Humber Station Road would provide access to Mayfield Road, which Highway413 would cross.

Highway413 would cross the Peel–York regional boundary at Regional Road50 (former Highway 50) immediately north of York Regional Road49 (Nashville Road; former Highway 49), where it would encounter a freeway-to-freeway interchange with an extension of Highway427 northward from Major Mackenzie Drive West (York Regional Road 25).
Curving northeast, the proposed route would encounter the CP MacTier Subdivision before crossing over the Humber River at the location of the Humber Valley Heritage Trail.
Between the main branch and east branch of the Humber River would be an interchange with York Regional Road27 (former Highway 27) north of Kleinburg. The final several kilometres would travel east, midway between Kirby Road and King Vaughan Road. After an incomplete interchange with Weston Road (York Regional Road56) it would end at a freeway-to-freeway interchange with Highway400.

History

2002 to 2018 
The GTA West Corridor was first conceived as the GTA East–West Economic Corridor by the Ministry of Transportation of Ontario (MTO) in its Central Ontario Strategic Transportation Directions study in January 2002.
The North–South Corridor Feasibility Study, prepared for the MTO and City of Brampton in September 2003, was first to recommend acquiring land for a future "higher order transportation facility" around Brampton.
The report identified the need for a controlled-access highway as part of the city's ultimate transportation plan to serve western Brampton. Land was subsequently set aside for the next several years while the MTO analysed the need for both corridors.

In 2005, the Government of Ontario passed the Places to Grow Act, which set forth consistent urban planning principles across the province for the following 25years. The Growth Plan for the Greater Golden Horseshoe was released in June of the following year as a framework for implementing the act, 
with a future transportation corridor identified north of Highway401 between Guelph and Vaughan. 
Following the submission of a Terms of Reference on June15, 2007, an  began
on March4, 2008, to establish conceptual routes for additional transportation infrastructure to interconnect the GTA West economic centres (Milton, Brampton and Vaughan) with Guelph and Waterloo Region.
The early concepts for the GTA West Corridor considered five different options, including two extending as far west as Guelph without intersecting Highway401 or Highway407.
When combined with the planned Highway 7N west of Guelph, they would have resulted in a parallel freeway to the north of Highway401 between Kitchener/Waterloo and Vaughan.

Simultaneously, the City of Brampton appealed an amendment of the Halton Region Official Plan to the Ontario Municipal Board. As a result, the North–South Corridor Feasibility Study evolved into the Halton–Peel Boundary Area Transportation Study (HPBATS), which commenced on April11, 2007.
HPBATS recommended a north–south route, known as the Halton–Peel Freeway, east of Georgetown and west of Brampton as a complementary project that would connect in the north with the potential GTA West Corridor. The completed study and its recommendations were submitted to the MTO in late April 2010.
In 2012 the provincial EA recommended that the GTA West should follow a broadly similar corridor to the Halton–Peel Freeway.

Stage 1 of the EA concluded with the release of the GTA West Transportation Development Strategy Report in November 2012. The report indicated limited demand for and the considerable environmental consequences of a new crossing of the Niagara Escarpment. It recommended not proceeding further with a new route over the escarpment, instead favouring a connection to Highway401 west of Mississauga, including the route of the proposed Halton–Peel Freeway. An alternative route, connecting with Highway401 west of Milton and travelling between 5Side Road and 10Side Road through Halton Hills, was also not carried forward, with the MTO instead electing to widen Highway401 to 12 lanes between Milton and Mississauga.

Stage 2 of the GTA West EA began in February 2014, intended to further refine the study corridor to a preliminary design.
However, by this point public opposition to the corridor began to appear, with the group Environmental Defence starting a campaign against the proposed highway by 2015.
On December16, 2015, Minister of Transportation Steven Del Duca announced the suspension of the EA process.
A three-member advisory panel
was formed in October 2016 to assess alternative approaches to meet projected traffic levels.
The suspension was opposed by the municipalities of Vaughan, King, York Region, Caledon and Peel Region,
as well as Brampton.
The advisory panel report was released on May29, 2017,
recommending that the EA be stopped, and the "development of a single transportation plan for the Greater Golden Horseshoe" proceed in its place.
The panel also recommended that the provincial government negotiate with the private operators of the 407ETR to encourage the routing of more truck traffic onto that route, alleviating congestion on the 401, and negating the need for the GTA West.
Consequently the Ontario government cancelled the GTA West Study on February9, 2018.
In the run up to the 2018 provincial election, the Progressive Conservatives stated that they would complete the EA of the project if elected.

2018 to present 
The 2018 Ontario general election, held on June7, 2018, ended the 15-year tenure of the Ontario Liberal Party and saw Premier Kathleen Wynne defeated by the Progressive Conservatives (PCs) under Doug Ford.
As part of the PCs Fall Economic Statement, released in November 2018, the government committed to the campaign pledge of resuming the suspended  for the GTA West Corridor, "in order to speed up travel and alleviate traffic congestion".
The EA was subsequently resumed on June 5, 2019.
In September and October of that year, a series of Public Information Centres were held in which the preferred route and interchange locations were announced.
This route, with modifications,
was confirmed publicly by the provincial government on August 7, 2020.
The EA for the corridor was expected to be complete by the end of 2022.

On February3, 2021, Jonathan Wilkinson, the federal Minister of Environment and Climate Change announced that he had received a request for the project to undergo an EA at the federal level,
following a formal request from Environmental Defence.
On May3, 2021, Wilkinson announced that a federal EA would take place.
In response, provincial Minister of Transportation Caroline Mulroney stated that she would work with the federal government to address “newly found concerns" on potential adverse effects on species at risk.

Funding was committed to the project as part of the fall economic statement on November1, 2021.
That month, the GTA West began to be referred to by the Government of Ontario as Highway413 for the first time.
The highway was a contentious issue during the 2022 Ontario general election, with the Liberal, NDP and Green Party pledging to cancel the project if elected.
The three NDP MPPs in Brampton were defeated by their PC counterparts in the election.

In early 2023, 467 landowners along the planned route received letters requesting permission to enter their property for "intrusive and nonintrusive fieldwork" to assess the suitability of their property for the project. The inspections will be conducted between March 2023 and the end of 2024.

Impacts and environmental concerns 
The highway has attracted criticism from municipalities, politicians, campaign groups and the public regarding its potential impacts.

Environmental groups have criticised the significant impact that the highway would have on the environment. In addition to increasing air pollution and greenhouse gas emissions, opponents claim the highway would disrupt woodlands, waterways, wetlands, wildlife habitats and species at risk.
The highway will travel through both the Greenbelt, the Whitebelt (an area of land left unprotected from development when the Greenbelt was established in 2005) and the Humber and Credit watersheds. 
According to the Toronto and Region Conservation Authority, the highway would specifically impact 85waterways, 220wetlands, 10different species at risk and hundreds of acres of vulnerable wildlife habitat. 

Urban planning critics claim the highway will encourage urban sprawl through induced demand,
as research shows that building new highways tends to attract more drivers and fails to improve congestion levels on other roads.
Consequently, they claim it would increase car dependency in surrounding areas and ultimately only save commuters around 30 to 60 seconds of travel time. Other groups, such as the National Farmers Union have concerns about the impacts of the highway on agricultural land, as the highway would be built on around 2,000 acres of Class 1 and 2 farmland – the most productive designation. 
A planning land use expert noted that "agricultural land is valued as low as C$18,000 an acre, but residential land is easily worth C$1 million an acre" and that billions of dollars could be made if farmland adjacent to the highway was rezoned as land for development.
In 2021, a Toronto Star investigation noted that  of land along the route was owned by 8 major property developers, several of which had donated to Doug Ford's Progressive Conservative government. 

Other critics have noted the high cost of building the highway – the cost of construction in 2012 was estimated at C$4.7billion, with recent estimates around C$6billion. It is unclear whether the highway would be tolled, similar to Highway 407, Highway 412 and Highway 418.
As an alternative to a new freeway, stakeholders have suggested investing in local transportation improvements. Some proposed suggestions include improvements to local roads, truck priority lanes on Highway407, public transit investments including GO Transit Regional Express Rail and widening of existing highways.
Others have suggested working with the owners of Highway407 to increase capacity on that highway instead. A study commissioned by the previous provincial government stated that the highway would save drivers between 30 and 60 seconds of travel time, while the MTO stated in 2021 that the highway would save drivers 30 minutes.

Perspectives 

The majority of local municipalities have opposed the project, including Mississauga, Vaughan,
Halton Hills,
Halton Region,
Peel Region,
King Township
and Orangeville.
Brampton and Caledon withdrew their support of the fast-tracked environmental assessment.
The NDP opposition in the Legislative Assembly of Ontario, the Green Party of Ontario
and Ontario Liberal Party have stated that they would scrap the highway following the next provincial election.
Despite the corridor not directly impacting the City of Toronto itself, Toronto City Council passed a resolution in March 2021 condemning the proposed highway.

Supporters of the freeway include Regional Municipality of York
as well as the Progressive Conservative government.
Several non-governmental organizations such as the Ontario Trucking Association,
the Building Industry and Land Development Association (BILD),
and the Association of Municipalities of Ontario also continue to support the project.
The Toronto Metropolitan University Centre for Urban Research and Land Development (CUR) also specifically supported the streamlining of the EA process, noting that “It is simply taking too long to bring critical infrastructure improvements such as roads, transit, sewers and water to completion".

Exit list 
The following table lists the proposed exits along Highway413, as shown in the Preferred Route.

Notes

References

External links 

 Project Website
 
 Approximate routing of GTA West Corridor on Google Maps

Proposed roads in Canada
400-series highways